The Sauber C30 is a Formula One racing car developed by Sauber Motorsports for use in the 2011 Formula One season. As with the Sauber C29 the car is powered by a Ferrari engine, but with added capability to house Ferrari's customer KERS system.

The chassis was designed by James Key, Christoph Zimmermann, Pierre Waché and Seamus Mullarkey with the car being powered with a customer Ferrari engine. 

Some 2010 sponsors, including Mad Croc Energy, have returned. The car was driven by Kamui Kobayashi and Mexican newcomer Sergio Pérez. The car was unveiled on 31 January 2011 at the Circuit Ricardo Tormo in Valencia, Spain. On the following day, Kobayashi became the first driver to test the car.

Season review
 
At the first race in Melbourne, both Pérez and Kobayashi scored points, finishing in 7th and 8th place respectively, scoring a total of 10 points. However, following the discovery of a non-regulation rear wing, both cars were disqualified and their points were redistributed.

Unlike the  C29 the C30 was reliable from the start of the season and developments came at a respectable rate, keeping it easily within the top 10. Kobayashi finished in the top 10 in the first seven races, and amassed 25 points - including a fifth at Monaco, and a seventh in Canada after running in second at the restart. Sergio Pérez was forced to retire in Malaysia when a piece of a Toro Rosso flew off and sliced his car.

The next ten races were not so successful for Kobayashi only having one points finish - in Germany. Pérez scored his best race result, in Britain, finishing seventh; before he was robbed of an equal result in Monza where both cars retired with gearbox failures. This put Force India ahead of them in the Constructors' Championship, into sixth place. Pérez got back into the points in Singapore, with tenth place, but this was nothing compared to the twelve points Force India scored at that race. At the  Kobayashi impressed his home fans by going fastest in Q1 and qualifying a career best seventh. When Kobayashi had a not so successful race, Pérez made advantage of making one less pit stop, finishing an impressive eighth. Kobayashi re-captured his form when he finished the last two races in a points scoring finish, tenth in Abu Dhabi and 9th in Brazil. In total, they accumulated the same number of points as the previous season's Sauber C29.

Continued use after Formula One
The Sauber C30 forms the basis of the Heritage F1 HF1-018 which uses the Sauber designed C30 chassis, front suspension and aerodynamic devices. The HF1-018 is advertised as the fastest track day car in the world and is powered by a small capacity turbo charged engine similar to that used in the 2014 onwards Formula One championship but does not use a KERS system as the original C30 did. According to the Heritage F1 website the HF1-018 was constructed by the UK based motorsport engineering company TDF.

The HF1-018 made its debut in May 2018 at Circuit Zolder as part of a FORCE F1 demonstration. The car has since featured in numerous television adverts, press adverts and F1 demonstrations, most recently at the 2018 Silverstone Classic where it was driven by Oliver Webb and Jessica Hawkins. In June 2018, Billy Monger drove a Formula One racing car for the first time when he tested the HF1-018 at the Rockingham Motor Speedway in Corby. The car had been specially converted to match the hand controls present in the Carlin BRDC British Formula 3 car he races. A documentary feature about Monger's first Formula One drive was shown as part of Sky F1's coverage of the 2018 Austrian Grand Prix.  During the 2019 Chinese Grand Prix race weekend, Jessica Hawkins drove a special livery HF1-018 (also known as F1-1000,  to celebrate the 1000th F1 championship race) as a part of the F1 Shanghai Festival 2019 - F1 live roadshow.

Complete Formula One results
(key) (results in bold indicate pole position; results in italics indicate fastest lap)

References

External links

Sauber C30 Engineering & Materials (official site)
About the Heritage HF1-018 car (official site)

C30
2011 Formula One season cars